This is a list of public art in the Leicestershire county of England. This list applies only to works of public art on permanent display in an outdoor public space. For example, this does not include artworks in museums.

City of Leicester

Blaby district

Charnwood district

Harborough district

Hinckley and Bosworth district

Melton district

North West Leicestershire district

Oadby and Wigston district

References 

Le
Culture in Leicestershire
Public art